The Inspector-General of Intelligence and Security (IGIS) is the official responsible for supervising New Zealand's two main intelligence agencies: the
Security Intelligence Service (SIS)  and the Government Communications Security Bureau (GCSB).

The current Inspector-General is Brendan Horsley, who commenced in the position in June 2020.

The position is chosen by the Prime Minister, after consultation with the Leader of the Opposition.

Traditionally the office has been very small, and includes a Deputy Director, two advisors, and investigation staff. This expansion is to be accompanied by greater resourcing and a more intensive role.

Functions of the Inspector-General
The Inspector-General of Intelligence and Security (IGIS) is a statutory officer appointed under the Inspector-General of Intelligence and Security Act 1996. It replaced an earlier Commissioner for Security Appeals, a position created in 1969. 

The IGIS assists the Minister responsible for NZSIS and GCSB, usually the Prime Minister, to ensure the activities of each agency comply with the law; ensure that complaints relating to these agencies are independently investigated; and review those bodies' compliance procedures and systems. Neither the National Assessments Bureau nor the Directorate of Defence Intelligence and Security are under the oversight of the role. 

The Inspector-General does not have a management role in the NZSIS or GCSB and cannot order them to take, or to cease, any activity - the role is limited to reporting concerns and findings to the Minister, who ultimately is responsible for corrective action. 
 
The Inspector-General conducts inquiries into matters of concern, including individual complaints, report findings and recommendations to the Minister. Those reports, excluding matters of security concern, may be found on the Inspector-General's website. The Inspector-General also makes a report each year to the Minister. A copy of that report, excluding material of security concern or which may cause danger is presented to Parliament. A copy, without deletions, must be given to the Leader of the Opposition.

Details on how to make a complaint to the Inspector-General can be found under the Complaints section of the website.

List of Inspectors-General
 Hon. Justice Laurence Greig (1996–2004)
 Hon. Justice Paul Neazor QC (2004–2013)
 Hon. Justice Andrew McGechan CNZM QC (2013–2014)
 Hon. Justice Cheryl Gwyn (2014–2019)
 Madeleine Laracy (acting 2019–2020)
 Brendan Horsley (2020–present)

See also
 Inspector-General of Intelligence and Security (Australia)
 Central Intelligence Agency Office of Inspector General

References

External links
 Inspector-General of Intelligence and Security Act 1996
 The Inspector-General of Intelligence and Security website

New Zealand intelligence agencies